The 1986 All-Ireland Minor Hurling Championship was the 56th staging of the All-Ireland Minor Hurling Championship since its establishment by the Gaelic Athletic Association in 1928. The championship began on 7 May 1986 and ended on 7 September 1986.

Cork entered the championship as the defending champions.

On 7 September 1986, Offaly won the championship following a 3-12 to 3-9 defeat of Cork in the All-Ireland final. This was their first ever All-Ireland title.

Cork's Dan O'Connell was the championship's top scorer with 9-02.

Results

Leinster Minor Hurling Championship

First round

Semi-finals

Final

Munster Minor Hurling Championship

First round

Semi-finals

Finals

Ulster Minor Hurling Championship

Final

All-Ireland Minor Hurling Championship

Semi-finals

Final

Championship statistics

Top scorers

Top scorers overall

Miscellaneous

 Offaly won the Leinster Championship for the first time in their history before going on to claim their inaugural All-Ireland Championship.

References

External links
 All-Ireland Minor Hurling Championship: Roll Of Honour

2
All-Ireland Minor Hurling Championship